The men's 110 metres hurdles was the only hurdling event on the Athletics at the 1896 Summer Olympics programme. The preliminary heats were the first track event of the day on 7 April. Eight competitors ran in two heats of four runners each. Only the fastest two runners in each heat advanced to the final. The event was won by Thomas Curtis of the United States.

Background

This was the first appearance of the event, which is one of 12 athletics events to have been held at every Summer Olympics. It was not a well-known event. Two top hurdlers, Stephen Chase of the United States and Godfrey Shaw of Great Britain, were not present. In Greece, Anastasios Andreou was thought to be unbeatable. Grantley Goulding of Great Britain apparently had the same view of himself. Alajos Szokolyi had won the Hungarian Olympic trials and was considered a strong contender there.

Competition format

The competition consisted of semifinals and a final. There were meant to be three or four semifinal heats, but with only eight competitors, only two heats were held. The top two runners in each semifinal heat advanced to the 4-man final.

Records

No world record was recognized until 1912, when the IAAF recognized a 1908 performance as the first world record. There was no standing Olympic record before the first Games.

Each race set a new Olympic record. Grantley Goulding won the first semifinal in 18.4 seconds. Thomas Curtis won the second semifinal in 18.0 seconds. Curtis then won the final in 17.6 seconds to finish the Games with the Olympic record.

Schedule

The precise times of the events are not recorded. The 110 metres hurdles semifinal round was the first event of the afternoon session on the second day, which began around "half past two". The final was the third event of the fifth day's afternoon.

Results

Semifinals

The semifinal heats were held on 7 April. The top two finishers in each of the two heats advanced to the final.

Semifinal 1

Grantley Goulding of Great Britain finished first, in a time of 18.4 seconds. Szokolyi was in the lead but hit the last hurdle and stumbled. It is not entirely clear what happened next. Goulding certainly passed Szokolyi and finished first. Szokolyi got up and crossed the finish line along with Reichel; there was some dispute over which had finished second and which third. Neither man competed in the final, eliminating a reliable way of resolving the dispute. The Official Report placed Szokolyi second. Mallon & Widlund place Reichel second. Ekkehard zur Megede places Szokolyi second. The IOC webpage lists Szokolyi as a finalist, suggesting he was second.

Semifinal 2

The Americans finished 1st and 2nd in this heat, with Thomas Curtis advancing to the final with a time of 18 seconds, and Hoyt second. Athanasios Skaltsogiannis of Greece and Kurt Doerry of Germany also competed, though their final positions are not recorded.

Final

The final of the 110 metre hurdles was run on 10 April. Hoyt withdrew in order to prepare for the pole vault. As there are conflicting reports of who qualified in second from the first heat, there are conflicting reports of why that runner did not run. Mallon and Widlund, who assert Reichel was second in the heat, write that Reichel was forced to scratch from the final as he was serving as an assistant to Albin Lermusiaux in the marathon. Sources placing Szokolyi second rather than Reichel do not generally give a reason for Szokolyi's absence, but Szokolyi himself recounted that "[w]hen the final came—after a lot of negotiations we were both canceled as second." The Official Report says, of both Hoyt and presumably Szokolyi rather than Reichel, as the Report placed Szokolyi second, that "[n]o other competitor came forward" than Curtis and Goulding.

In any case, only two athletes competed, but they finished within one-tenth of a second. Goulding led at the final hurdle, being a better hurdler, but Curtis passed him in the straight and won a tight race by two inches.

Results summary

References

Notes
  (Digitally available at la84foundation.org)
  (Excerpt available at la84foundation.org)
 

Men's hurdles 110 metres
Sprint hurdles at the Olympics